Narendra P. Thakker (born 1945) is a former Kenyan cricketer who played internationally for East Africa, including at the 1979 and 1982 ICC Trophies. He played as a wicket-keeper.

A regular player for Kenya in regional tournaments, Thakker first played for East Africa in 1972, when he toured England and played against several county teams. He played his one and only first-class match in January 1974, against a Marylebone Cricket Club team that was returning the tour. In the match, played at Nairobi's Gymkhana Club Ground, he opened the batting with Jagoo Shah in both innings, scoring one run in the first and 22 in the second. At the 1979 ICC Trophy in England, Thakker shared East Africa's captaincy with Charanjive Sharma, with each player captaining the team in two of its four matches. His best performance was 44 not out against Argentina. At the 1982 edition of the tournament, where he made his last international appearances, Thakker shared the wicket-keeping duties with Raghuvir Patel. He was one of the few East African players at the tournament with first-class experience.

See also
 List of Kenyan first-class cricketers

References

External links
 Player profile and statistics at CricketArchive
 Player profile and statistics at ESPNcricinfo

1945 births
Living people
East African cricketers
Kenyan cricketers
Kenyan people of Indian descent
East African cricket captains
Wicket-keepers